TNT HD may refer to high-definition television services from:

 Turner Network Television, American cable channel 
 Télévision Numérique Terrestre, French digital terrestrial service
 TNT Serie, German television channel 
 TNT (Sweden), Swedish television channel